Gillam Township is one of thirteen townships in Jasper County, Indiana, United States. As of the 2010 census, its population was 640 and it contained 277 housing units.

In 1832, the first permanent white settlement in the area was made in what is now Gilliam Township.

History
Independence Methodist Church was listed on the National Register of Historic Places in 1982.

Geography

Unincorporated towns
 Baileys Corner

Adjacent townships
 Cass Township, Pulaski County (northeast)
 White Post Township, Pulaski County (east)
 Salem Township, Pulaski County (southeast)
 Hanging Grove Township (south)
 Barkley Township (west)
 Walker Township (northwest)

Cemeteries
The township contains two cemeteries: Mason and Robinson.

Education
Gillam Township residents may request a free library card from the Jasper County Public Library.

References
 
 United States Census Bureau cartographic boundary files

External links
 Indiana Township Association
 United Township Association of Indiana

Townships in Jasper County, Indiana
Townships in Indiana